The South Carolina Department of Public Safety (SCDPS) exists to ensure the safety of South Carolina's citizens and visitors. The employees of the Department of Public Safety fulfill this mission by:

Enforcing the traffic, motor vehicle and motor carrier laws;
Educating the public on highway safety;
Administering highway safety and criminal justice grant programs;
Operating a comprehensive law enforcement training program and certification process;
Providing security and safety services for public officials as well as state properties.

Divisions

The SC Department of Public Safety comprises four main divisions:

South Carolina Highway Patrol Division - Colonel Christopher N. Williamson
South Carolina State Transport Police Division - Colonel Dean Dill
South Carolina Bureau of Protective Services - Chief Matthew Calhoun

The SC Department of Public Safety also comprises the following offices:

Office of Highway Safety and Justice Programs
Office of Human Resources
Office of Professional Responsibility
Office of Communications

See also

 List of law enforcement agencies in South Carolina

References

External links
SCDPS Website
SC Highway Patrol Website
SC State Transport Police Website
SC Bureau of Protective Services Website

Other links
SC Criminal Justice Academy Website

State law enforcement agencies of South Carolina
1993 establishments in South Carolina